Rumi á Jannat is a Maldivian sitcom, created by Aishath Fuad Thaufeeq and Ahmed Tholal under Dark Rain Entertainment. The series was distributed by Medianet Multi-Screen and directed by Ali Shifau and Mohamed Faisal. With a cast starring Abdullah Shafiu Ibrahim, Nuzuhath Shuaib, Sheela Najeeb and Roanu Hassan Manik the show revolves on the initial days after the wedding of a couple who are distinctly different worldviews and personalities. The pilot episode of the series was released on 1 January 2021.

Cast

Main
 Abdullah Shafiu Ibrahim as Rumi Yoosuf
 Nuzuhath Shuaib as Hawwa Jannat
 Mohamed Faisal as Nadhir "Nadey"
 Adam Rizwee as Hassan
 Roanu Hassan Manik as Kuda Maalimee
 Maria Teresa Pagano as Bianca Parmigiano
 Sheela Najeeb as Filameena
 Ahmed Saeed as Haadhy
 Raufath Sodhiq as Meerab
 Mohamed Rifshan as Ali "ET" Idhurees

Recurring
 Ahmed Sunie as Nestum
 Ali Shazleem as Chintu
 Ahmed Shakir as Mogabe
 Hamdhoon Farooq as Jaadhu
 Aminath Noora as Haadhy’s wife
 Ibrahim Shiyaz as Adhanu

Guest
 Razeena Thaufeeq as a designer (Episode 4)
 Shammoon Mohamed as Firdaus (Episode 6)
 Aishath Gulfa as Shabana (Episode 8)
 Ali Shameel as Nadhir’s neighbor (Episode 10)
 Ahmed Giyas as a customer (Episode 14)
 Mariyam Shifa as Lizy (Episode 15)
 Mohamed Waheed as Lizy's father (Episode 15)
 Ismail Wajeeh as Sam (Episode 15)

Episodes

Production
On 9 October 2020, Dark Rain Entertainment announced their first sitcom web series titled Rumi á Jannat. The project was initiated during the lockdown period of COVID-19 pandemic due to the temporary closure of cinemas digital platforms being the sole reason for entertainment. A customized set was developed for the filming of the series. On location rehearsal of the series was commenced on 18 October 2020. The main cast of the series was revealed on 9 November 2020 which includes Mariyam Majudha and Abdullah Shafiu Ibrahim in titular roles along with actors Roanu Hassan Manik, Sheela Najeeb, Ahmed Saeed, Adam Rizwee, Mohamed Faisal and Maria Teresa Pagano. On 29 December 2020, it was revealed that Nuzuhath Shuaib will replace Mariyam Majudha as Jannat citing the health condition of the latter.

Soundtrack

Release and response
The series was made available for streaming through Medianet Multi-Screen from 1 January 2020. The pilot episode of the series was met with positive reviews from critics. Aminath Luba revieweing from Sun was pleased with the comic-timing of the characters and toning down the comical value to the required level, rather than going over the top. "From actors capturing the traits to presenting the comedy narrations, the directors and actors have pulled off their respective roles to near perfection". Echoing similar sentiments, Ahmed Rasheed from MuniAvas complimented the writing of the series for incorporating moral ethics alongside the comedy".

References

Serial drama television series
Maldivian television shows